All Day Long may refer to:

 "All Day Long" (Garth Brooks song), 2018
 "All Day Long" (Kenny Burrell album), 1957
 "All Day Long" (New Order song), song from the 1986 album Brotherhood
 All Day Long: A Portrait of Britain at Work, 2015 book by Joanna Biggs